William Farris Kennedy (July 2, 1888 – August 10, 1951) was a Canadian politician. He served in the Legislative Assembly of British Columbia from 1928 to 1933  from the electoral district of North Okanagan, as a Conservative.

References

British Columbia Conservative Party MLAs
1888 births
1951 deaths
People from Wahoo, Nebraska